The second season of the television series Arthur was originally broadcast on PBS in the United States from October 20, 1997 to April 17, 1998 and contains 20 episodes. This season, like seasons 1 and 3, was released on DVD in Europe only; due to the fact that this was actually two production seasons (the first ten episodes encompassing the first and the last ten encompassing the second) combined into one long season for US airings, the first ten episodes for this season can be found on the "Series 2" DVD and the last ten can be found on "Series 3."

Production
In a September 2021 episode of Jason Szwimer's podacast Finding D.W., Daniel Brochu (Buster Baxter's voice actor) revealed that the inspiration for "Arthur's Faraway Friend" originated when he decided to take a sabbatical to Australia. As the producers did not want to replace him, it was written into the show that Buster would be traveling with his father, much like Brochu himself.

Episodes

References 

General references 
 
 
 
 

1997 American television seasons
1998 American television seasons
Arthur (TV series) seasons
1997 Canadian television seasons
1998 Canadian television seasons